Protein bars are nutrition bars that contain a high proportion of protein to carbohydrates/fats.

Dietary purpose 
Protein bars are targeted to people who primarily want a convenient source of protein that does not require preparation (unless homemade). There are different kinds of food bars to fill different purposes. Energy bars provide the majority of their food energy (calories) in carbohydrate form. Meal replacement bars are intended to replace the variety of nutrients in a meal. Protein bars are usually lower in carbohydrates than energy bars, lower in vitamins and dietary minerals than meal replacement bars, and significantly higher in protein than either.

Protein bars are mainly used by athletes or exercise enthusiasts for muscle building.

Protein bar niche 
In addition to other nutrients, the human body needs protein to build muscles. In the fitness and medical fields it is generally accepted that protein after exercise helps build the muscles used. Whey protein is one of the most popular protein sources used for athletic performance. Other protein sources include egg albumen protein and casein, which is typically known as the slow digestive component of milk protein. Alternative protein bars may use insect protein as an ingredient. Vegan protein bars contain only plant-based proteins from sources like peas, brown rice, hemp, and soybeans.

Issues

Sugar content 
Protein bars may contain high levels of sugar and sometimes are called "candy bars in disguise".

Supplementation controversy 
There is a disagreement over the amount of protein required for active individuals and athletic performance. Some research shows that protein supplementation is not necessary. Athletes generally consume higher levels of protein as compared to the general population for muscular hypertrophy and to reduce lean body mass lost during weight loss.

References 

Bodybuilding supplements
Snack foods
Proteins as nutrients